Eric Dick (born October 3, 1994) is an American professional soccer player who plays as a goalkeeper for Major League Soccer club Minnesota United.

Career

College and youth
Dick  moved from Roeland Park, Kansas, to Carmel, Indiana when he was 5 
He played two years of college soccer at Butler University between 2013 and 2017, including a redshirted year in 2013. During his time at Butler, Dick kept 28 shutouts.

Dick also appeared for Premier Development League sides Portland Timbers U23s in 2015 and OKC Energy U23 in 2017.

Professional
On January 19, 2018, Dick was drafted in the first-round (13th overall) during the 2018 MLS SuperDraft by Sporting Kansas City. Dick signed with Sporting KC on February 15, 2018.

Dick made his professional debut with Kansas City's United Soccer League affiliate Swope Park Rangers on March 31, 2018, when Swope Park Rangers lost 2–1 to Las Vegas Lights.

On June 29, 2019, Dick was sent on a one-game loan to USL Championship side Tulsa Roughnecks.

Dick, who spent most of the season on loan at USL Championship side Phoenix Rising, was released by Kansas City following their 2020 season.

On December 22, 2020, his rights were acquired by Columbus Crew SC in Stage Two of the MLS Re-Entry Draft. On June 24, 2021, Dick joined USL Championship club Indy Eleven on loan. Following the 2021 season, Columbus opted to decline their contract option on Dick.

After been selected by Minnesota United FC in Stage 2 of the 2021 MLS Re-Entry Draft, Dick officially signed with the club on January 18, 2022.

Career statistics

Club

References

External links 
 
 
 

1994 births
Living people
American soccer players
Association football goalkeepers
Butler Bulldogs men's soccer players
Columbus Crew players
Indy Eleven players
Minnesota United FC players
OKC Energy FC players
People from Carmel, Indiana
Phoenix Rising FC players
Portland Timbers U23s players
Soccer players from Indiana
Sporting Kansas City draft picks
Sporting Kansas City players
Sporting Kansas City II players
FC Tulsa players
USL Championship players
USL League Two players
All-American men's college soccer players
Soccer players from Kansas
Major League Soccer players